Gullybreen is a glacier in Albert I Land at Spitsbergen, Svalbard. It is located in the peninsula Hoelhalvøya, south of Magdalenefjorden. The glacier debouches into Gullybukta, a southern bay of Magdalenefjoirden.

References 

Glaciers of Spitsbergen